Fandango is the fifth full-length album by New Zealand band, The Phoenix Foundation. The first double-album by the band, it was released in Australasia on 26 April 2013, and in England soon after. Fandango'''s final track "Friendly Society" is one of their longest to date, running just under 18 minutes in length.

Release

The first single from Fandango'' was "The Captain", released in late January 2013, alongside an announcement that the album would be released at the end of April. The full album was made available for streaming on The Guardian two weeks before its release date.

Track listing

All songs written and performed by The Phoenix Foundation.

Disc one
"Black Mould" – 5:30
"Modern Rock" – 6:12
"The Captain" – 3:38
"Thames Soup" – 5:07
"Evolution Did" – 3:48
"Inside Me Dead" – 5:56
"Corale" – 7:39

Disc two
"Supernatural" – 6:08
"Walls" – 3:45
"Morning Riff" – 4:33
"Sideways Glance" – 6:58
"Friendly Society"  – 17:41

Personnel
Luke Buda
Tom Callwood
Chris O'Connor
Will Ricketts
Samuel Scott
Conrad Wedde

Additional Personnel
Richie Singleton
James Milne
Neil Finn
Holly Beals
Lucien Johnson
Lee Prebble

References

2013 albums
The Phoenix Foundation albums
Albums recorded at Roundhead Studios